Lionel Butler (born July 25, 1967) is an American former professional boxer who competed from 1989 to 2010. He is  best known for his 1995 fight with Lennox Lewis, but also faced world champions Tony Tubbs, James Smith, Chris Byrd, and Oliver McCall. Though he never held or challenged for a world title from any of the main four sanctioning bodies (WBC, IBF, WBA, WBO) outside of his eliminator bout with Lewis, he won the vacant IBO heavyweight title in 1993 and unsuccessfully challenged for the title again against Brian Neilson in 1998.

Professional career

Butler made his professional debut on February 24, 1989 in a losing effort to future contender Phil Jackson. In his second fight, Butler was knocked out in the second round by the debuting future Undisputed Heavyweight Champion Riddick Bowe on March 6 of that year. The following month, Butler would pick up his first victory against Michael Carroll. Butler struggled during the early portion of his career, going 6–10–1 in his first 17 fights, however, Butler's fortune would change in 1991, as he racked up three consecutive first-round knockouts during that year and followed with 13 more knockout victories from 1992 to 1994 (one victory was later changed to a no-contest after Butler failed a drug test after the fight). During his 16-fight undefeated streak, Butler scored victories over such fighters as former WBA heavyweight champions Tony Tubbs (whom Butler dispatched in less than one round) and James "Bonecrusher" Smith, while also winning both the IBO and California heavyweight title on February 23, 1993 with a victory over Tony Willis. Butler's success was halted in 1993 when a positive test for marijuana earned Butler a six-month suspension and he was subsequently stripped of both heavyweight titles as a result. Butler rebounded and in 1995, now ranked the number two heavyweight by WBC would get his first high-profile match, as he was matched up against Lennox Lewis, who had recently lost his title to Oliver McCall, in a "eliminator" bout with the winner earning the right to fight for the WBC heavyweight championship. Butler, however, came into the fight grossly out-of-shape at 261 pounds and was thoroughly outboxed by Lewis, who knocked Butler out in the fifth round. Following his loss to Lewis, Butler was never quite able to reach the level of success he had obtained from 1991 to 1994. Butler would win the World Boxing Federation (WBF) heavyweight title on January 23, 1997 after defeating Marcos Gonzalez by first-round knockout, but would lose to up-and-coming heavyweights Chris Byrd and Michael Grant. In 1998, Butler would challenge the undefeated Danish boxer Brian Nielsen for the IBO heavyweight title, but was knocked out in the first round. Butler would then take a three-year hiatus from boxing before returning in January 2002. Butler would win the first four fights of his comeback before meeting the once highly regarded knockout artist Andre Purlette, who promptly knocked out Butler in the second round. Butler would again leave boxing after the Purlette fight, but would launch one more comeback in 2009. He would go 1–2 in three fights between 2009 and 2010 before retiring for good following a loss to Damian Wills on June 12, 2010.

Professional boxing record

References

1967 births
Boxers from California
Heavyweight boxers
Living people
Boxers from Louisiana
People from Bogalusa, Louisiana
American male boxers